Acrobasis ptilophanes is a species of snout moth in the genus Acrobasis. It was described by Edward Meyrick in 1929. It is found on the Society Islands.

References

Moths described in 1929
Acrobasis
Moths of Oceania